Charité is a German drama television series. The first season was directed by Sönke Wortmann, and was written by Grimme-Preis winner Dorothee Schön and Sabine Thor-Wiedemann. The season is set during 1888 and the years following at Berlin's Charité hospital. The series premiered on 21 March 2017 on the German channel Das Erste, and was distributed in the USA and UK on Netflix between April 2018 and June 2022.

A second series went into production in November 2017, and first aired in Germany in February 2019. This season is directed by Anno Saul and was also written by Schön and Thor-Wiedemann. It is set in the years from 1943 to 1945. The cast was replaced with an entirely new set of actors because of the many years elapsed in the storyline. This second series began streaming on Netflix in North America in mid-2019 as Charité at War.

Season 3 launched on ARD and Netflix Germany on 12 January 2021. The season is set in 1961, the same year that construction began on the Berlin Wall.

Cast

Season 1
 Alicia von Rittberg as Ida Lenze, a patient and recipient of a life-saving operation who becomes an indentured medical assistant for the hospital. 
  as Georg Tischendorf, a medical student who wishes to be an artist
 Justus von Dohnányi as Robert Koch, a revolutionary bacteriologist, who's recently returned from India
 Matthias Koeberlin as Emil Behring, an ambitious doctor with an opium addiction
 Christoph Bach as Paul Ehrlich, a Jewish doctor with  tuberculosis. 
 Ernst Stötzner as Rudolf Virchow, a professor and head of pathology. 
 Matthias Brenner as Ernst von Bergmann, a surgeon
  as 
 Emilia Schüle as Hedwig Freiberg, an actress with an almost-obsessive interest in bacteriology and particularly Robert Koch.
 Ramona Kunze-Libnow as Matron Martha, the devout matron of the nurses at Charité.
 Klara Deutschmann as Sister Therese, a recently promoted nurse and friend of Ida
 Tanja Schleiff as Nurse Edith, a nurse with unionization aspirations
 Monika Oschek as Nurse Stine, a nurse who comes down with diphtheria
 Daniel Sträßer as Heinrich von Minckwitz, a reporter for the Berlin Daily
 Greta Bohacek as Mariechen
 Stella Hilb as Hedda Ehrlich
 Lucas Prisor as Kaiser Wilhelm II
 Runa Greiner as Else Spinola
 Rosa Enskat as Emmi Koch
 Yusuke Yamasaki as Kitasato Shibasaburō, a Japanese bacteriological working with Robert Koch.
 Michael Pitthan as Arthur Conan Doyle 
 Thomas Zielinski as Carl Hagenbeck

Season 2
 Mala Emde as Anni Waldhausen, a medical student, studying eugenics under De Crinis and writing a dissertation on self-mutilation; an expectant mother
 Ulrich Noethen as Ferdinand Sauerbruch, a pioneering surgeon and the head of surgery at Charité
 Jannik Schümann as Otto Marquardt, a medical student,  to be sent to the Russian front, closely-aligned with Ferdinand
 Luise Wolfram as Margot Sauerbruch, Ferdinand's wife
 Artjom Gilz as Artur Waldhausen, Anni's husband, working for De Crinis, euthanising "unwanted children"
 Jacob Matschenz as Martin Schelling, a doctor with a prosthetic leg, works for Ferdinand and is especially close to Otto.
 Frida-Lovisa Hamann as Nurse Christel, a nurse who still believes in Germany's "ultimate victory"
 Susanne Böwe as Nurse Käthe, a matron nurse
 Lukas Miko as Max de Crinis, a surgeon general high-ranking in the NSDAP; a staunch proponent of eugenics and heading up Aktion T4
 Hans Löw as Adolphe Jung (de), an immigrant doctor who hides his dislike of the NSDAP
 Sarah Bauerett as Maria Fritsch (de), an American spy along Fritz Kolbe
 Marek Harloff as Fritz Kolbe, an American spy with Maria Fritsch
 Peter Kremer as Georg Bessau (de), a professor who softly champions the involuntary euthanasia program
 Katharina Heyer as Magda Goebbels, Joseph Goebbels's wife 
 Maximilian Klas as Peter Sauerbruch, Ferdinand and Margot's son
 Pierre Kiwitt as Claus von Stauffenberg, a soldier who served alongside Peter
 Max von Pufendorf as Hans von Dohnányi, a severely-ill patient of Ferdinand's
 Anja Schneider as Christine von Dohnanyi, Hans's wife
 Thomas Neumann as Karl Bonhoeffer, De Crinis's predecessor
 Ludwig Simon as Paul Lohmann, a patient at Charité suspected of having self-inflicted a gunshot wound

Season 3 

 Nina Gummich as Ella Wendt
 Nina Kunzendorf as Ingeborg Rapoport
 Philipp Hochmair as Otto Prokop
 Uwe Ochsenknecht as Helmut Kraatz
 Max Wagner as Alexander Nowack
 Franz Hartwig as Curt Bruncken
 Patricia Meeden as nurse Ariana
 Amber Bongard as nurse Petra
 Hildegard Schroedter as head nurse Gerda
 Uwe Preuss as janitor Fritz Krug
 Timo Meitner as assistant Wittenberg
 Anatole Taubmann as Mitja Rapoport
 Nicholas Reinke as party secretary Lehmann
 Peter Miklusz as Hajo Brennscheidt 
 Christian Beermann as captain Hertweck

Episodes

Series 1 (2017)
Between breakthroughs in medical research and enormous social upheavals in 1888, the Charité is well on its way to becoming the most famous hospital in the world. It is a city within the city, following its own laws and rules. At the beginning of the Wilhelmine Period, up to 4,000 patients are treated annually. Along with the expected injuries caused by the booming Industrialization, patients suffer from infectious diseases such as tuberculosis, diphtheria, typhoid and cholera, as well as from sexually transmitted diseases. In addition, there are many medical students, taught at the Berlin University, who are being trained in this famous hospital by the future Nobel Prize winners and most prestigious doctors of the time: Rudolf Virchow, the founder of the modern health care systems, Robert Koch, the discoverer of the tuberculosis bacillus, Emil von Behring, whose work contributed greatly to the healing of diphtheria, and Paul Ehrlich, who developed the first drug against syphilis.

Series 2 (2019)
In 1943, more and more patients are admitted into the Berlin Charité due to World War II. The hospital is still considered a focal point for medicine, but the staff is divided since some members do not support the regime while others are staunch followers of the government. One of the best known doctors at the Charité is Ferdinand Sauerbruch, a surgeon practicing there since 1928. He became world-famous in the 1930s by developing innovative surgical techniques which greatly decreased the risks of operations at the time. He was also responsible for inventing new types of prostheses which improved the mobility of a patient's remaining muscle. He seems to become more and more critical of the Nazi regime as World War II progresses, which makes him clash with several of his colleagues. One of them is Max de Crinis, a psychiatrist. He is a high-ranking member of the SS who greatly supports the government. Unlike Sauerbruch, De Crinis is also an avid proponent of the country's euthanasia programmes, some of which are carried out at the Charité.

Series 3 (2021)

References

External links 

 
 Charité on Global Screen

2017 German television series debuts
German drama television series
German documentary television series
2010s German television miniseries
English-language television shows
Charité
German medical television series
Television series set in the 1880s
Television series set in the 1890s
Television shows set in Berlin
2010s LGBT-related drama television series